The following are non-definitive lists of the actors with the highest career-film grosses. There are box-office gross revenue lists, which are not adjusted for inflation, as well as lists for the number of box-office ticket sales.

Box-office gross revenue 

Because of the long-term effects of inflation on movie theater ticket prices, a list unadjusted for inflation gives far more weight to later actors. Therefore, the gross revenue lists are largely meaningless for comparing acting careers widely separated in time, as many actors from earlier eras will never appear on a modern unadjusted list, despite their films' achieving higher commercial success when adjusted for price increases.

Lead roles 
This list only includes leading roles and lead ensemble roles, including voice acting. The list is updated .

All roles 
This list includes cameos and voice acting. The number of films is from the source The Numbers and may not correspond exactly to a linked filmography. The list is updated .

Earlier eras

Up until 2000 
A survey by TLA Video in 2000 estimated that the following actors had sold the most movie tickets at the box office.

Up until 1966 
In 1966, Variety calculated a list of the highest-grossing stars using their All-Time Top Grossing Films lists based on the number of films that had earned theatrical rentals of $4 million or more in the United States and Canada by the end of 1965. As the list was based on number of films on the chart, there may have been some stars who appeared in fewer films listed but with a higher total rental. As with current lists, the list favors films and stars of the later eras as later films generally gross more. John Wayne topped the list. Variety noted that Crosby's last hit prior to 1965 was High Society in 1956, and at that date he would have led the list. They also noted that Gable was the undisputed king until he went into the Army in 1942 and that he wasn't ranked higher, as many of his earlier hits did not reach their $4 million cut-off and were therefore not included in his total.

See also 
 Top Ten Money Making Stars Poll
 Lists of highest-grossing films
 List of highest-grossing film directors
 List of highest-grossing film producers
 List of highest-paid film actors
 Bankable star
 Movie star

References 

Film box office
Film-related lists of superlatives
Lists of film actors
 Actors